Klebas (pop. 91) is one of the 31 localities belonging to the municipality of Lesachtal in Carinthia (Austria).

Villages in Carinthia (state)